Rusyliv may refer to the following villages in the Western Ukraine:

 Rusyliv, Ternopil Oblast, Ternopil Oblast
 Rusyliv, Lviv Oblast, Lviv Oblast